Eurovision Young Dancers was a biennial dance competition for European dancers that are aged between 16 and 21. The contest was created by the European Broadcasting Union (EBU) in 1985. Only members of the EBU may take part in the contest. Eleven countries took part in the inaugural contest.

Participants
The Eurovision Young Dancers, inspired by the success its counterpart Eurovision Young Musicians, was a biennial competition organised by the European Broadcasting Union (EBU) for European dancers that are aged between 16 and 21. The first edition of the Eurovision Young Dancers, then known as Eurovision Competition for Young Dancers, took place in Reggio Emilia, Italy, on 16 June 1985 and eleven countries took part.  won the first edition in 1985, represented by Arantxa Argüelles. The 2019 contest was cancelled, so it will be excluded from the table.

Other EBU members
The following list of countries were eligible to participate in Eurovision Young Dancers, but never made their début at the contest.

Participating countries in the decades 
The table lists the participating countries in each decade since the first Eurovision Young Dancers was held in 1985.

1980s

1990s

2000s

2010s

Broadcast in non-participating countries

List of winners

By contest

By country

The table below shows the top-three placings from each contest, along with the years that a country won the contest.

See also 
 List of countries in Eurovision Choir
 List of countries in the Eurovision Song Contest
 List of countries in the Eurovision Dance Contest
 List of countries in the Eurovision Young Musicians
 List of countries in the Junior Eurovision Song Contest

Notes

References

 
Eurovision Young Dancers